St George's Church, Benenden is a Church of England church in Benenden, Kent. The building is Grade II* listed with Historic England.

References

External links 

Church of England church buildings in Kent
Grade II* listed churches in Kent